Angela Gaye Walker (married name Subramaniam; born 19 March 1967) is a New Zealand writer and former rhythmic gymnast. She won a gold medal and three bronze medals representing her country at the 1990 Commonwealth Games.

Early life and family
Walker was born in Auckland on 19 March 1967. Her father, Ian Walker, served in the Royal Air Force and Bomber Command during World War II and was a prisoner of war.

Rhythmic gymnastics
Walker competed for New Zealand in the rhythmic gymnastics individual all-around competition at the 1988 Summer Olympics in Seoul. There she tied for 32nd place in the preliminary (qualification) round and did not advance to the final.

She later won a gold and three bronze medals competing at the 1990 Commonwealth Games.

Later life
In 1995, Walker married Kannan Subramaniam.

Walker has written biographies of her father, published in 2017, and Dame Yvette Williams (2022).

Published works

References

External links 
 
 
 

1967 births
Living people
Commonwealth Games bronze medallists for New Zealand
Commonwealth Games gold medallists for New Zealand
Commonwealth Games medallists in gymnastics
New Zealand rhythmic gymnasts
Gymnasts at the 1988 Summer Olympics
Gymnasts at the 1990 Commonwealth Games
Olympic gymnasts of New Zealand
Sportspeople from Auckland
21st-century biographers
New Zealand biographers
21st-century New Zealand women writers
21st-century New Zealand writers
Medallists at the 1990 Commonwealth Games